Daniel Kolář (born 27 October 1985) is a Czech former professional footballer who played as an attacking midfielder, spending most of his career with Viktoria Plzeň. At international level, he made 29 appearances for Czech Republic national team scoring twice. After his retirement, he continued at Viktoria Plzeň as a sport manager.

In 2006, he won the Talent of the Year award at the Czech Footballer of the Year awards. He won the Czech Cup in 2010 and five time Czech First League title with FC Viktoria Plzeň and AC Sparta Prague.

Career statistics

Club

International
Scores and results list the Czech Republic's goal tally first, score column indicates score after each Kolář goal.

Honours
Viktoria Plzeň
 Czech First League: 2010–11, 2012–13, 2014–15, 2015–16
 Czech Cup: 2009–10
 Czech Supercup: 2011, 2015

Sparta Prague
 Czech First League: 2006–07

Individual
 Czech Talent of the Year: 2006

References

External links
 
 
 
 

Living people
1985 births
Czech footballers
Footballers from Prague
Association football midfielders
Czech Republic international footballers
Czech Republic under-21 international footballers
Czech Republic youth international footballers
UEFA Euro 2012 players
UEFA Euro 2016 players
Czech First League players
Süper Lig players
1. FC Slovácko players
FK Chmel Blšany players
AC Sparta Prague players
FC Viktoria Plzeň players
Gaziantepspor footballers
Czech expatriate footballers
Czech expatriate sportspeople in Turkey
Expatriate footballers in Turkey